Poundbury is an experimental urban extension on the western outskirts of Dorchester in the county of Dorset, England. The development is led by the Duchy of Cornwall, and had the keen endorsement of King Charles III when he was Prince of Wales and Duke of Cornwall. Under the direction of its lead architect and planner Léon Krier, its design is based on traditional architecture and New Urbanist philosophy. 

Due for completion in 2025, it is expected to house a population of 6,000. 2,000 people in over 180 businesses are engaged in its development and construction. Poundbury has been praised for reviving the low-rise streetscape built to the human scale and for echoing traditional local design features, but it has not reduced car use, as originally intended. A 2022 report said "Poundbury has been highlighted for its pedestrian and public transport links and not being as 'car-based' as other developments across the country."

Mission
Poundbury has been built according to the principles of Charles III, who is known for holding strong views challenging the post-war trends in town planning that were suburban in character. Since starting in 1993, the town has received both criticism and praise from architects and design critics.

The development is built to a traditional high-density urban pattern, rather than a suburban one, focused on creating an integrated community of shops, businesses, and private and social housing; there is no zoning. The planners say they are designing the development around people rather than the car, and they aim to provide a high-quality environment, from the architecture to the selection of materials, to the signposts, and the landscaping. To avoid constant construction, utilities are buried in common utility ducts under the town. Common areas are maintained by a management company to which all residents belong. It consists of 35 percent social housing and is designed for sustainable development, which includes carbon neutrality.

To some degree, the project shows similarities with the contemporary New Urbanism movement. The development brief outlined having a centre built in a classical style and outer neighbourhood areas in a vernacular style, with design influences taken from the surrounding area. The development includes period features such as wrought iron fences, porticos, gravelled public squares, and 'bricked-up' windows; known as blind windows, these traditionally serve an aesthetic function and are widely misattributed to the window tax.

History

In 1987, the land was included in the West Dorset District Council local plan as a preferred location for development to expand the town of Dorchester. Charles III, at that time Prince of Wales and Duke of Cornwall, had already taken an interest in architecture and urban design, and was writing his book A Vision of Britain: A Personal View of Architecture. Seeing an opportunity to put his ideas into practice, the Duchy of Cornwall chose to lead on planning the development itself, rather than simply sell the land to an established housebuilder. The Driehaus Prize-winning New Classical architect Léon Krier was hired in 1988 to design the development.

Construction commenced in 1993, and is expected to be complete around 2025, with the north-west quadrant being the last built. The final configuration will support approximately 5,800 people.

Greetings card entrepreneur Andrew Brownsword sponsored the £1 million development of the market hall at Poundbury, designed by John Simpson and based on early designs, particularly the one in Tetbury.

As of 2018, Poundbury had a population of 3,500 residents.

Economy and employment

In 2010, Poundbury increased Dorset's county local economy contributing over £330 million; it is expected to contribute £500 million in the next 15 years.

In 2010, more than 2,000 Poundbury residents were working in 180 local businesses.  In 2017, the number of businesses increased to 185, providing 2,345 jobs.  Businesses include a Waitrose store, a technical company which produces parts for aeroplane wings, and a chocolate factory.

One notable local employer is the breakfast food manufacturer and exporter Dorset Cereals, which since 2000 has employed more than 100 people at its purpose-built barn factory. Dorset Cereals moved to another location in Dorset in 2019.  Reportedly there is space for about 80 additional businesses.

Education 
Poundbury has two primary schools in the catchment area: The Prince of Wales and Damers First School. The latter was an existing school in Dorchester, but in 2017 relocated to Poundbury where a new school building was constructed.

Attractions and landmarks

Due to Poundbury's unique appearance and plan, the town has been visited by architects, government officials, planners, housebuilders, and developers from around the world.

Tourist attractions are centred around the Queen Mother Square, which includes Strathmore House in honour of King Charles’ grandmother Queen Elizabeth The Queen Mother's heritage. In 2016, the Queen Mother statue was unveiled at the square by Elizabeth II and her husband, Prince Philip, Duke of Edinburgh. Also in 2016, a pub named the Duchess of Cornwall Inn was opened in honour of the wife of Charles III (then Prince of Wales), Camilla, Queen Consort.

Every year in August, the Dorset Food & Arts Festival is held at Queen Mother Square attracting thousands of people. The festival showcases the town's fine produce and arts and also raises money for charities.

In 2018, the Prince of Wales officially opened Poundbury's first church, the Dorchester Community Church.

In May 2022 the Prince of Wales formally opened a huge play area in Poundbury's largest park, the Great Field.  The Great Field is now a park under the care of Dorchester Town Council.

Reception

Poundbury's street plan and aesthetics have been variously praised and criticised by several commentators. Writing in Architect magazine, Professor Witold Rybczynski said that "Poundbury embodies social, economic, and planning innovations that can only be called radical."  Poundbury was intended to reduce car dependency and encourage walking, cycling, and public transport. A survey conducted at the end of the first phase, however, showed that car use was higher in Poundbury than in the surrounding (rural) former district of West Dorset; but a 2022 report said "Poundbury has been highlighted for its pedestrian and public transport links and not being as 'car-based' as other developments across the country."

Among the critics, Stephen Bayley described it as "fake, heartless, authoritarian and grimly cute". In 2009, Dorchester Fire Station, designed by Calderpeel Architects, was shortlisted for the Carbuncle Cup award for ugly buildings.

Nonetheless, the project has also received praise. In 2013, on the 20th anniversary of the project, the New Urbanist publication Better Cities and Towns wrote that it was "winning converts". A few years later, British architecture and design critic Oliver Wainwright of The Guardian wrote, "Poundbury, the Prince of Wales's traditionalist village in Dorset, has long been mocked as a feudal Disneyland. But a growing and diverse community suggests it's getting a lot of things right." He argued that its main success was achieving genuine mixed-use development. Countering criticisms of Poundbury's aesthetics, English philosopher Sir Roger Scruton praised the town for its commitment to pre-modern architectural and planning principles. In the BBC documentary Why Beauty Matters, Scruton exclaimed that

Gallery

See also
Fairford Leys – a similar project located on the edge of Aylesbury
Poundbury Hill – an Iron Age hill fort near Poundbury
Driehaus Architecture Prize
Knockroon – a similar project with Duchy of Cornwall involvement in Scotland
Nansledan – a similar project with Duchy of Cornwall involvement beside Newquay

References
Charles, Prince of Wales: A Vision of Britain: A Personal View of Architecture (Doubleday, 1989) 
Leon Krier: Architecture: Choice or Fate (Andreas Papadakis Publishers, 1998) 
Sandy Mitchell. "Prince Charles is not your typical radical." National Geographic.  May 2006. . Retrieved 9/14/06

Notes

External links

 
Poundbury at Duchy of Cornwall Office
Unofficial Poundbury business guide and local information

Populated places established in 1993
New Urbanism communities
Villages in Dorset
Duchy of Cornwall
Geography of Dorchester, Dorset
New towns in England
1993 establishments in England
Charles III
New Classical architecture
New towns started in the 1990s